Byzantine Italy was those parts of the Italian peninsula under the control of the Byzantine empire after the fall of the Western Roman Empire (476). The last Byzantine outpost in Italy, Bari was lost in 1071. Chronologically, it refers to:

Praetorian prefecture of Italy (540/554–584)
Exarchate of Ravenna (584–751)
Theme of Sicily (687–902)
Theme of Longobardia (c. 891 – c. 965)
Catepanate of Italy (965–1071)

Several states avoided conquest by the Lombards or Franks and maintained nominal Byzantine allegiance even after the Byzantine presence in Italy came to an end:

Republic of Venice
Duchy of Naples
Duchy of Gaeta
Duchy of Amalfi
Duchy of Sorrento

Likewise, the island of Sardinia maintained Byzantine allegiance in this obscure period:

Judgeships of Sardinia

 
Italy